Lockengate is a  hamlet in Cornwall, England, UK. It is two miles south of Lanivet on the A391 road. It is in the civil parish of Luxulyan

There was once a mission church here which was sold in 1972. This church already existed in 1877.

References

Hamlets in Cornwall